Edward Michael Grosz, (February 16, 1945) is an American prelate of the Roman Catholic Church who served as auxiliary bishop of the Diocese of Buffalo in New York from 1990 to 2020.

Biography
Edward Grosz was born on February 16, 1945, in Buffalo, New York. He studied at Saint John Vianney Seminary in East Aurora, New York.  He was ordained a priest by Bishop James A. McNulty for the Diocese of Buffalo on May 29, 1971.

Auxiliary Bishop of Buffalo 
Grosz was appointed auxiliary bishop of the Diocese of Buffalo and titular bishop of Morosbisdus on November 22, 1989, by John Paul II. He was consecrated a bishop on February 2, 1990, by Bishop Edward Head.

Retirement and legacy 
Grosz's letter of resignation as auxiliary bishop of the Diocese of Buffalo was accepted by Pope Francis on March 2, 2020.Grosz serves as chaplain to the western branch of the Polish National Alliance.

On November 23, 2020, New York Attorney General Letitia James filed a lawsuit against Grosz, the Diocese of Buffalo and Bishop Richard J. Malone.  The lawsuit claimed that they misused diocese funds to cover up alleged sexual abuse of minors by over two dozen priests. At the same time, a 218-page report was released detailing a two-year investigation by the state Attorney General's office against all parties named in the lawsuit.

References

External links
 Roman Catholic Diocese of Buffalo Official Site

Episcopal succession
 

Bishops
20th-century American Roman Catholic titular bishops
1945 births
Living people
American people of Polish descent